Manuel Lopes Fonseca, better known as Manuel da Fonseca (15 October 1911 in Santiago do Cacém – 11 March 1993), was a Portuguese writer.

References 

1911 births
1993 deaths
Portuguese male writers
20th-century Portuguese writers
People from Setúbal District
20th-century male writers